Joseph Edward Murray (April 1, 1919 – November 26, 2012) was an American plastic surgeon who performed the first successful human kidney transplant on identical twins Richard and Ronald Herrick on December 23, 1954.

Murray shared the Nobel Prize in Physiology or Medicine in 1990 with E. Donnall Thomas for their discoveries concerning "organ and cell transplantation in the treatment of human disease."

Early life and education
Murray was born to William A. and Mary (née DePasquale) Murray, and grew up in Milford, Massachusetts. He was of Irish and Italian descent. A star athlete at the Milford High School, he excelled in football, ice hockey, and baseball. Upon graduation, Murray attended the College of the Holy Cross intending to play baseball; however, baseball practices and lab schedules conflicted; forcing him to give up baseball. He studied philosophy and English, earning a degree in humanities at Holy Cross. 
Murray later attended Harvard Medical School. After graduating with his medical degree, Murray began his internship at the Peter Bent Brigham Hospital. During that time, he was inducted into the Medical Corps of the U.S. Army.

He served in the plastic surgery unit at Valley Forge General Hospital in Pennsylvania. At Valley Forge General Hospital he worked for an esteemed plastic surgeon, Bradford Cannon, and developed a lifelong passion for plastic surgery. His unit cared for thousands of soldiers wounded on the battlefields of World War II, working to reconstruct their disfigured hands and faces. His interest in transplantation grew out of working with burn patients during his time in the Army. Murray and his colleagues observed that the burn victims rejected temporary skin grafts from unrelated donors much more slowly than had been expected, suggesting the potential for organ grafts, or transplants.

After his military service, Murray completed his general surgical residency, and joined the surgical staff of the Peter Bent Brigham Hospital. He then went to New York to train in plastic surgery at New York and Memorial Hospitals, returning to the Brigham as a member of the surgical staff in 1951.

In 2001, Murray published his autobiography, Surgery Of The Soul: Reflections on a Curious Career.

Career
On December 23, 1954, Murray performed the world's first successful renal transplant between the identical Herrick twins at the Peter Bent Brigham Hospital (later Brigham and Women's Hospital), an operation that lasted five and a half hours. He was assisted  by Dr. J. Hartwell Harrison and other noted physicians. In Operating Room 2 of the Peter Bent Brigham Hospital, Murray transplanted a healthy kidney donated by Ronald Herrick into his twin brother Richard, who was dying of chronic nephritis. Richard lived for eight more years following the operation. In 1959, Murray went on to perform the world's first successful allograft and, in 1962, the world's first cadaveric renal transplant.

Throughout the following years, Murray became an international leader in the study of transplantation biology, the use of immunosuppressive agents, and studies on the mechanisms of rejection. In the 1960s, top scientists investigating immunosuppressive drugs sought to work with Murray. Together, they tailored the new drug Imuran (generic azathioprine) for use in transplants. The discovery of Imuran and other anti-rejection drugs, such as prednisone, allowed Murray to carry out transplants from unrelated donors. By 1965, the survival rates after receiving a kidney transplant from an unrelated donor exceeded 65%. 

As a Harvard Medical School faculty member, Murray trained physicians from around the world in transplantation and reconstructive surgery, frequently performing surgeries in developing countries. In his 20 years as director of the Surgical Research Laboratory at Harvard and the Peter Bent Brigham Hospital, he inspired others who became leaders in transplantation and biology throughout the world. He served as chief plastic surgeon at the Peter Bent Brigham (which later became Brigham and Women's Hospital) until 1986. He also served as chief plastic surgeon at Children's Hospital Boston from 1972 to 1985, retiring as professor of Surgery Emeritus in 1986 from Harvard Medical School.

In 1990, he was honored with the Nobel Prize in Physiology or Medicine for his pioneering work in organ transplantation.

Murray was elected as a member of the National Academy of Sciences and as a regent of the American College of Surgeons. He received the American Surgical Association's Medal for Distinguished Service to Surgery, the American Academy of Arts and Sciences' Francis Amory Prize, the American Association of Plastic Surgeons' Honorary Award and Clinician of the Year Award, and the National Kidney Foundation's Gift of Life Award. He was named one of the 350 most outstanding citizens, representing the medical profession, for the City of Boston's 350th anniversary. In 1991, Murray received the Golden Plate Award of the American Academy of Achievement. In 1996, he was appointed Academician of the Pontifical Academy of Sciences in the Vatican.

Personal life
Murray's father was a noted lawyer and a district court judge. Murray married his college life sweetheart Bobby Link, a school teacher, in June 1945, with whom he would have 6 children: 3 boys and 3 girls.

Murray was selected to receive the Laetare Medal by the University of Notre Dame in recognition of outstanding service to the Catholic Church and society in March 2005.

Death
Murray died on November 26, 2012, aged 93. He suffered a stroke at his suburban Boston home on Thanksgiving and died at Brigham and Women's Hospital, the very hospital where he had performed the first organ transplant operation.

Murray is featured in the book Beyond Recognition, previously titled Camel Red. The book  is the story of Larry Heron, who was very seriously injured in World War II, and his road to recovery, which reunited him with Murray, a former classmate.

References

External links
  including the Nobel Lecture 8 December 1990 The First Successful Organ Transplants in Man
 The Joseph E. Murray papers can be found at The Center for the History of Medicine at the Countway Library, Harvard Medical School.

1919 births
2012 deaths
American Nobel laureates
American people of Irish descent
American people of Italian descent
American surgeons
United States Army personnel of World War II
College of the Holy Cross alumni
Harvard Medical School alumni
Members of the Pontifical Academy of Sciences
Members of the United States National Academy of Sciences
Nobel laureates in Physiology or Medicine
People from Milford, Massachusetts
United States Army officers
Laetare Medal recipients
Physicians of Brigham and Women's Hospital
Members of the National Academy of Medicine